Morskoye is a rural locality (a selo) in Dakhadayevsky District, Republic of Dagestan, Russia. The population was 1,186 as of 2010. There are 7 streets.

Nationalities 
Dargins live there.

Geography
Morskoye is located 65 km east of Urkarakh (the district's administrative centre) by road. Chishili and Buskri are the nearest rural localities.

References 

Rural localities in Dakhadayevsky District